AlexNet is the name of a convolutional neural network (CNN) architecture, designed by Alex Krizhevsky in collaboration with Ilya Sutskever and Geoffrey Hinton, who was Krizhevsky's Ph.D. advisor.

AlexNet competed in the ImageNet Large Scale Visual Recognition Challenge on September 30, 2012. The network achieved a top-5 error of 15.3%, more than 10.8 percentage points lower than that of the runner up.  The original paper's primary result was that the depth of the model was essential for its high performance, which was computationally expensive, but made feasible due to the utilization of graphics processing units (GPUs) during training.

Historic context 

AlexNet was not the first fast GPU-implementation of a CNN to win an image recognition contest. A CNN on GPU by K. Chellapilla et al. (2006) was 4 times faster than an equivalent implementation on CPU. A deep CNN of Dan Cireșan et al. (2011) at IDSIA was already 60 times faster and outperformed predecessors in August 2011. Between May 15, 2011 and September 10, 2012, their CNN won no fewer than four image competitions. They also significantly improved on the best performance in the literature for multiple image databases. 

According to the AlexNet paper, Cireșan's earlier net is "somewhat similar." Both were originally written with CUDA to run with GPU support. In fact, both are actually just variants of the CNN designs introduced by Yann LeCun et al. (1989) who applied the backpropagation algorithm to a variant of Kunihiko Fukushima's original CNN architecture called "neocognitron." The architecture was later modified by J. Weng's method called max-pooling.

In 2015, AlexNet was outperformed by Microsoft Research Asia's very deep CNN with over 100 layers, which won the ImageNet 2015 contest.

Network design 

AlexNet contained eight layers; the first five were convolutional layers, some of them followed by max-pooling layers, and the last three were fully connected layers. The network, except the last layer, is split into two copies, each run on one GPU. The entire structure can be written aswhere 

 CNN = convolutional layer (with ReLU activation)
 RN = local response normalization
 MP = maxpooling
 FC = fully connected layer (with ReLU activation)
 Linear = fully connected layer (without activation)
 DO = dropout

It used the non-saturating ReLU activation function, which showed improved training performance over tanh and sigmoid.

Influence 
AlexNet is considered one of the most influential papers published in computer vision, having spurred many more papers published employing CNNs and GPUs to accelerate deep learning. As of early 2023, the AlexNet paper has been cited over 120,000 times according to Google Scholar.

References

Deep learning software
Object recognition and categorization